Calathus jakupicensis is a species of ground beetle from the Platyninae subfamily that is endemic to North Macedonia.

Description and endemism
It was described by Borislav V. Guéorguiev who discovered it on Karadzica mountain in North Macedonia in 2008. It was named after the massif it was discovered on.

References

jakupicensis
Beetles described in 2008
Beetles of Europe
Endemic arthropods of North Macedonia